Astragalus gilmanii is a species of milkvetch known by the common name Gilman's milkvetch. It is native to the desert scrub and woodland of Nevada, the California Sierra Nevada and Inyo Mountains, and it is known from a few locations in the Panamint Range adjacent to Death Valley in California.

Description
Astragalus gilmanii is a small, low-lying annual or perennial herb forming clumps of hairy stems up to 25 centimeters long. The leaves are up to about 7 centimeters long and are made up of several fuzzy, purple-margined green leaflets. The inflorescence bears 4 to 9 bright pinkish purple flowers each about 7 millimeters in length.

The fruit is an inflated papery legume around 2 centimeters long. It contains several seeds in its single chamber.

References

External links
Jepson Manual Treatment - Astragalus gilmanii
USDA Plants Profile: Astragalus gilmanii
Astragalus gilmanii - Photo gallery

gilmanii
Flora of California
Flora of Nevada
Flora of the Great Basin
Flora of the Sierra Nevada (United States)
Flora of the California desert regions
Panamint Range
Endemic flora of the United States